Coffin v. United States, 156 U.S. 432 (1895), was an appellate case before the United States Supreme Court in 1895 which established the presumption of innocence of persons accused of crimes.

F. A. Coffin and Percival B. Coffin, plaintiffs in error, and A. S. Reed had been charged with aiding and abetting the former president of the Indianapolis National Bank, Theodore P. Haughey, in misdemeanor bank fraud between January 1, 1891, and July 26, 1893.

It is a complex case with a 50-count indictment. But the most interesting aspect is commentary by the Court regarding presumption of innocence:

In the decision, the Court then goes on to detail the complete legal history of presumed innocence.

See also
 Reasonable doubt
 List of United States Supreme Court cases, volume 156

Further reading

External links

 

1895 in United States case law
United States criminal burden of proof case law
United States Supreme Court cases
United States Supreme Court cases of the Fuller Court